Sepia typica is a species of cuttlefish native to the southwestern Indian Ocean and southeastern Atlantic Ocean. Its natural range stretches from Saldanha Bay, South Africa to southern Mozambique. It lives at depths of 2 to 290 m.

Sepia typica is a very small species, growing to only 26 mm in mantle length.

The type specimen was collected in Table Bay, South Africa. It is deposited at the Kobenhavns Universitet Zoologisk Museum in Copenhagen.

References

External links

Cuttlefish
Molluscs described in 1875